Buzzy Wuzzy was an early American variety/comedy  series that aired on ABC on Wednesday nights from 7:30 pm to 7:45 pm Eastern Time from November 17 to December 8, 1948.

References

External links 

 

1948 American television series debuts
1948 American television series endings
1940s American variety television series
American Broadcasting Company original programming